Santa Fe Baldy is a prominent summit in the Sangre de Cristo Mountains of New Mexico, United States, located  15 mi (24 km) northeast of Santa Fe.  There are no higher mountains in New Mexico south of Santa Fe Baldy.  It is prominent as seen from Los Alamos and communities along the Rio Grande in northern New Mexico, but is relatively inconspicuous from Santa Fe, as its north-south trending main ridge line is seen nearly end-on, disguising the size of the mountain.  Tree line in the Sangre de Cristos is unusually high (exceeding  in places) and only the top  of the mountain is perpetually free of trees, but several severe forest fires have created bare spots extending to lower elevations.  An extensive region of aspen trees on its flanks produces spectacular orange-yellow coloration during the fall that is the subject of many photographic studies.

Santa Fe Baldy rises in the Pecos Wilderness within the Santa Fe National Forest, on the water divide between the Rio Grande and the Pecos River. The western slopes are drained by the Rio Capulin and the Rio Nambe, both flowing to the Rio Grande. The eastern side of the mountain consists of two small cirques, one containing Lake Katherine, one of the highest lakes in New Mexico at elevation . Contrary to popular belief, Lake Katherine was not given its name by theoretical physicist J. Robert Oppenheimer, in reference to his wife Katherine "Kitty" Oppenheimer. This naming convention predates their meeting by at least a decade, and the lake is instead named after Katherine Chaves Page Kavanaugh, owner of the Los Pinos Guest Ranch on the Pecos River. The attribution of the name to J. Robert Oppenheimer may be influenced by his known connection to Katherine Chaves Page Kavanaugh, as he was a frequent guest at the Ranch.

Under good conditions the summit is a simple "walk-up" climb, but the Sangre de Cristos are unusually prone to lightning, and during the summer months, the wise hiker is off Santa Fe Baldy and other high summits in the range by noon, to avoid afternoon thunderstorms.

Santa Fe Ski Basin is on the western slopes of Tesuque Peak.

On 11 June 2009, Santa Fe Baldy was the scene of a helicopter accident that claimed the lives of New Mexico State Police Sergeant Andrew Tingwall and University of New Mexico graduate student Megumi Yamamoto. The helicopter crashed after Tingwall rescued Yamamoto. Yamamoto had been hiking with her boyfriend, but had become lost.

Gallery

References

External links 

 
 

Mountains of New Mexico
Sangre de Cristo Mountains
Baldy
Santa Fe National Forest
Mountains of Santa Fe County, New Mexico